King's Cross station or Kings Cross station may refer to:

England
London King's Cross railway station, a mainline terminus in London
King's Cross St Pancras tube station, a London Underground station
King's Cross Thameslink railway station, a disused railway station in London

Other places
Kings Cross railway station, Sydney, in Sydney, Australia
King's Cross station, on the Hogwarts Express railway within the Universal Orlando Resort, in Florida, United States

See also
King's Cross (disambiguation)